Drozdov is a municipality and village in Beroun District in the Central Bohemian Region of the Czech Republic. It has about 800 inhabitants.

History
The first written mention of Drozdov is from 1368.

References

Villages in the Beroun District